The Spanish hogfish, Bodianus rufus, is a species of wrasse native to the western Atlantic Ocean, where it can be found from North Carolina and Bermuda through the Caribbean and the Gulf of Mexico to southern Brazil. While the adults feed on such prey as molluscs (snails, mussels, and squid), crustaceans (Mysis and brine shrimp), echinoderms (brittle stars and sea urchins), worms, and small fish, the juveniles act as cleaner fishes. This species is of minor importance to local commercial fisheries and can be found in the aquarium trade. When Marcus Elieser Bloch named the genus Bodianus he used Bodianus bodianus as the type species of the genus, this is a junior synonym of Bodianus rufus.

References

External links
 

Spanish hogfish
Fish described in 1758
Taxa named by Carl Linnaeus
Fish of the Atlantic Ocean
Labridae